East Russell Street Area Historic District is a national historic district located at Orangeburg, Orangeburg County, South Carolina. The district encompasses 55 contributing buildings in a residential section of Orangeburg. They include residences constructed between about 1850 and 1930, and includes large, one- and two-story, frame and brick houses and smaller one-story homes occupied by servants.  The houses are in a variety of popular architectural styles including Victorian, Colonial Revival, and Bungalow.

It was added to the National Register of Historic Places in 1985.

References

Houses on the National Register of Historic Places in South Carolina
Historic districts on the National Register of Historic Places in South Carolina
Victorian architecture in South Carolina
Colonial Revival architecture in South Carolina
Houses in Orangeburg County, South Carolina
National Register of Historic Places in Orangeburg County, South Carolina